Bengkoka is a state constituency in Sabah, Malaysia, that is represented in the Sabah State Legislative Assembly. This is one of the thirteen new state constituencies as result of approval from state legislative and Dewan Rakyat on 17 July 2019 and presenting for the first time for snap election

History

Representation history

Election results

References 

Sabah state constituencies